The Cuba women's national handball team represents Cuba in international handball competitions, and is controlled by the Federación Cubana de Balonmano.

The team participated in the 1999 World Women's Handball Championship and the 2011 World Women's Handball Championship.

Results

World Championship

Pan American Championship

Pan American Games
1987 – 4th
1995 – 4th
1999 – 3rd

Central American and Caribbean Games

Nor.Ca. Championship

Caribbean Handball Cup

Other tournaments
2016 Women's Four Nations Tournament – 4th

Current squad
Squad for the 2019 World Women's Handball Championship.

Head coach: Jorge Coll

References

External links
IHF profile

Handball
Women's national handball teams
National team